List of fastback automobiles includes examples of a car body style whose roofline slopes continuously down at the back. It is a form of back for an automobile body consisting of a single convex curve from the top to the rear bumper. This automotive design element "relates to an interest in streamlining and aerodynamics.

Two-door fastbacks

1931–1936 Stout Scarab
1933 Packard 1106 Twelve Aero Sport Coupe
1934–1937 Pierce-Arrow
1936–1937 Bugatti Type 57SC Atlantic
1938–1952 Plymouth sedans 
1938–2003 Volkswagen Type 1 (Beetle)
1941–1948 Pontiac Torpedo Custom
1941–1952 Pontiac Streamliner
1941 Buick Special Sedanette 46S
1941–1942 Nash 600
1941–1952 Chevrolet Fleetline
1946–1948 Chevrolet Fleetmaster
1946–1942 Packard sedans
1947–1950 Maserati A6 1500
1947–1956 Maserati A6G/54
1947–1966 Volvo PV444 and Volvo PV544
1948–1965 Porsche 356
1948–1949 Cadillac Series 61 and Series 62 Club Coupe Sedanet(te)
1948–1952 Hudson Commodore
1948–1955 Bristol 401, 402, and 403
1949 Tatra T601 Monte Carlo (Finned Fastback)
1949–1951 Nash Ambassador Airflyte
1949–1960 Saab 92 and Saab 93
1950–1950 Martin Stationette
1950–1951 Maserati A6G 2000
1952–1955 Bentley Continental R-Type
1960–1980 Saab 96
1961–1975 Jaguar E-type
1963–present Porsche 911
1963–1965 Aston Martin DB5
1963–1970 Maserati Mistral
1963–1976 Lancia Fulvia Sport
1963–1973 Isuzu Bellett
1964–1966 Honda S600
1964–1969 Plymouth Barracuda
1965–1967 AMC Marlin
1965–1978, 1993–Present Ford Mustang
1966–1970 Oldsmobile Toronado
1966–1967 Dodge Charger
1966–1973 Volkswagen Type 3 Fastback (dates are from U.S. lineup)
1966–1971 Jensen FF
1966–1976 Jensen Interceptor
1966–1973 Triumph GT6
1967–1970 Toyota 2000GT
1967–1968 Mercury Monterey and Ford Galaxie
1967–1970 Opel Olympia
1967–1971 Opel Commodore A
1967–1972 Aston Martin DBS
1967–1973 Maserati Ghibli
1967–1976 Sunbeam Rapier Fastback
1967-1979 Holden Torana and Holden Sunbird
1968–1973 Ferrari Daytona
1968–1973 Ford Fairlane Torino/Torino SportsRoof
1968–1978 Lamborghini Espada
1968–1969 Mercury Cyclone
1968–1972 Oldsmobile 442 and Oldsmobile Cutlass
1968–1973 Opel GT
1968–1974 Volkswagen Type 4
1968–1981 Isuzu 117 Coupé
1969–1986 Ford Capri
1969–1975 Maserati Indy
1969–1975 Sunbeam Alpine "Fastback"
1969–1976 Audi 100 Coupé S
1969–1978 Nissan S30
1969–1989 Aston Martin V8
1970–1992 Chevrolet Camaro
1970–1977 Ford Maverick and Mercury Comet
1970–1975 Mitsubishi Galant GTO
1970–1981 Pontiac Firebird
1970-1976 Volkswagen TL (Brazil)
1970-1975 Volkswagen Karmann-Ghia TC (Brazil)
1971–1977 Chevrolet Vega
1971–1980 Ford Pinto
1971–1988 Chevrolet Opala (Brazil)
1972–1973 Aston Martin Vantage
1972–1977 Ford Granada
1972–1987 Alfa Romeo Alfetta GT and Alfa Romeo Alfetta GTV
1973–1975 Leyland P76 Coupe
1973–1981 Volkswagen Passat (B1)
1973-1976 Volkswagen SP2
1974–1978 AMC Matador
1974–1982 Maserati Khamsin
1975–1980 Buick Skyhawk
1975–1986 Holden Gemini
1975–1980 Chevrolet Monza 2+2 and Monza Spyder
1975–1988 Nissan Silvia
1975–1980 Oldsmobile Starfire
1975–1982 Lotus Éclat
1975–1977 Pontiac Astre
1976–1977 Mercury Capri II
1976–1980 Pontiac Sunbird
1977–1989 Aston Martin V8 Vantage
1978–1980 Buick Century
1978–1980 Oldsmobile Cutlass Salon
1978–1986 Opel Monza
1979–1987 Mercury Capri
1979-1983 Nissan S130
1979–2002 Toyota Supra
1980–1991 Audi Quattro
1981–1987 Audi Coupé GT
1981–1988 Volkswagen Passat (B2)
1982–1992 Pontiac Firebird
1982–Present Chevrolet Corvette
1983–1987 Dodge Charger, Plymouth Duster and Plymouth Turismo
1983–1991 Honda Ballade CR-X
1986–1988 Pontiac Fiero GT
1989–1999 Nissan Silvia/180SX/240SX/200SX
1978–1995 Porsche 928
1992–2002 Mazda Rx-7 FD
1993–1998 Ruf BTR2
1994–2004 Aston Martin DB7
1996–present Porsche Cayman
1998 Bugatti EB 118
1998–present Ruf Turbo R
1999 Alfa Romeo 166 Bertone Bella
1999–2006 Honda Insight
2000–present Ruf RGT
2001–2007, 2012–present Aston Martin Vanquish
2003 Ford Visos
2003 Al Araba 1
2003–2005 Smart Roadster Coupe
2004–2008 Chrysler Crossfire
2004–Present Bentley Continental GT
2004–2016 Aston Martin DB9
2005–present Aston Martin Vantage
2005–2008 BMW Z4 Coupé
2006–2009 Pontiac Solstice Coupe
2007–2012 Aston Martin DBS
2009–2012 Aston Martin One-77
2009–2016 Hyundai Genesis Coupe
2010–2013 Dodge Viper
2011 Jaguar C-X16
2011–2012 Lexus LFA
2011–2012 Aston Martin Virage
2011–present Ferrari F12berlinetta
2012 AC 378 GT Zagato
2012–present Toyota 86, Scion FR-S and Subaru BRZ
2013–present Rolls-Royce Wraith
2013–present Equus Bass 770
2014 Maserati Alfieri
2014–2015 Aston Martin DB10
2014–present Jaguar F-Type Coupé
2014–present Mercedes-AMG GT
2014–present BMW i8
2015 Bugatti Atlantic concept
2015–2016 Aston Martin Vulcan
2016 Buick Avista
2016–Present Mazda MX-5 RF (ND)
2016–present Aston Martin DB11
2016–present Honda Civic Coupe
2017–present Ruf CTR Anniversary
2017–present Ferrari 812 Superfast
2017–present Lexus LC
2018–present Aston Martin DBS
2018–present Aston Martin Vantage
2019–present Toyota GR Supra
2020–present Ferrari Roma
2021–present Toyota GR86
2022–present Nissan Z (RZ34)

Four-door fastbacks

1933–1935 Pierce-Arrow Silver Arrow
1933–1936 Riley Nine (Kestrel)
1933–1951 Pontiac Streamliner
1934–1938 Tatra T77/T77A (Finned Fastback)
1936–1939 Tatra T97 (Finned Fastback)
1937–1950 Tatra T87 (Finned Fastback)
1938–1952 Plymouth sedans
1940–1948 Pontiac Torpedo
1946–1948 Chevrolet Fleetmaster
1946–1952 Tatra T600 Tatraplan (Finned Fastback)
1946–1958 GAZ-M20 Pobeda
1947–1953 Jowett Javelin
1947–1953 Standard Vanguard
1948 Tucker 48
1948–1952 Hudson Commodore
1948–1954 Hudson Hornet
1949 Lincoln Cosmopolitan Town Sedan
1949–1951 Nash Ambassador Airflyte
1950–1953 Tatra T87-603
1951–1957 FSO Warszawa (Polish M20 clone)
1952–1959 Borgward Hansa 2400
1965–1973 Opel Kadett B
1967–1970 Opel Olympia
1968–1974 Volkswagen Type 4
1969–1978 Citroën Ami 8
1970–1979 Citroën GS
1971–1976 Volkswagen TL
1972–1982 Lancia Beta Berlina
1973-1982 Austin Allegro
1973–1977 Nissan Violet
1973–1981 Volkswagen Passat (B1)
1974 Maserati Medici I
1974–1991 Citroën CX
1975-1981 Princess
1975–1984 Lancia Gamma Berlina
1975–1982 Hyundai Pony
1976 Maserati Medici II
1976–1986 Rover SD1
1978–1979 Buick Century
1978–1979 Oldsmobile Cutlass Salon and Cutlass Salon Brougham
1978–1982 Nissan Pulsar
1981–1988 Opel Ascona C
1981–1988 Volkswagen Passat (B2)
1982-1984 Austin Ambassador
1982–1994 Citroën BX
1986–1995 Yue Loong Feeling
1986–1999 Rover 800 series
1993 Bugatti EB 112
1999 Bugatti EB 218
1999 Volkswagen Concept D
2000–2006 Hyundai Elantra 5-Door GT
2003 Chevrolet SS concept
2003 Subaru B11S
2003 Opel Insignia Concept
2004 Alfa Romeo Visconti
2004–present Mercedes-Benz CLS-Class
2006–2012 Citroën C6
2007 Lincoln MKR
2007 BMW CS Concept
2008–2017 Volkswagen Passat CC
2009 Bugatti 16C Galibier
2009 Audi Sportback concept
2009–present Audi A5 Sportback
2009–present Porsche Panamera
2010–present Audi A7
2010–2020 Aston Martin Rapide and Aston Martin Rapide S
2010–2020 Hyundai Sonata
2011–present MG 6 GT
2012–present Tesla Model S
2012–present BMW 6 Series Gran Coupé
2013–present Mercedes-Benz CLA-Class
2013–2018 BMW 3 Series Gran Turismo
2014–present BMW 4 Series Gran Coupé
2014–present Ford Mondeo 
2015–present Hyundai Elantra
2015–present Geely Borui
2016 Cadillac Escala
2016–present Hyundai i30 Fastback
2016–present MG 6
2017–present Opel Insignia Gran Sport
2017–present Kia Stinger
2017–present Volkswagen Arteon
2017–present Buick Regal
2017–present Tesla Model 3
2018–present Honda Accord
2018–present Peugeot 508
2018–present Geely Borui GE
2018–2020 Holden Commodore
2019–present BMW 8 Series Gran Coupé
2019–present Hyundai i30 Fastback N
2019–present Cadillac CT5
2019–present Kia K5
2020–present Hyundai Sonata
2020–present XPeng P7
2021–present XPeng P5
2022–present ORA Lightning Cat
2025 Cadillac Celestiq

References

External links

Fastback